The palatial bath houses of the Shirvanshahs are dated back to the 15th century and are a part of the Shirvanshahs’ Palace Complex. It is in the eastern part of a lower yard.

Architecture
The bath house is deep, which is typical of bath-houses of whole the Absheron peninsula. Only cupolas were above the ground. The most biggest premises were covered with cupolas. Necessary temperatures of various premises had been tried to keep by an internal planning depending on their assignment.

Remains of cupolas and arched coverings are evidence of the highest standards of architecture. Reasoning of organization of the internal space and properly found correlation of dimensions of the premises should be especially mentioned.

References

Buildings and structures in Baku
Tourist attractions in Baku